The Friendly Ghost is a Famous Studios cartoon released on 16 November 1945 as part of its Noveltoons series of animated short movies. It is the first cartoon to feature the character Casper the Friendly Ghost.

Plot
Casper is seen reading the book How to Win Friends, a real book by Dale Carnegie. Every night at midnight his brothers and sisters scare people, except for Casper, who doesn't want to scare people, so he stays home instead. Casper decides that he would rather make friends with the living. While his family is off scaring people, Casper bids his pet cat goodbye and leaves home.

The next morning, he meets a rooster to whom he says hello but the rooster retreats. Casper next meets a mole. At first the mole is happy to befriend him but when he puts on eyeglasses, he sees that Casper is a ghost and jumps back in his hole. Casper later meets a mouse and a cat who resemble Herman and Katnip and who flee into the barn upon seeing him. Casper then sees a flock of chickens who fly away with their hen house and splatter eggs on him.

Casper grows sad because he's "just a scary old ghost". When he hears a train whistle he decides to kill himself by having the train run over him, apparently forgetting that he is already dead. After the train passes over Casper without harming him, he begins crying. Casper is approached by a boy and a girl named Johnny and Bonnie who want to play with him, which makes Casper very happy.

After a game of ball and jump rope, Bonnie and Johnny introduce Casper to their mother, who screams and tells Casper to leave. Casper picks up his sack and is about to go through the door when a banker opens it. The banker orders Casper to tell the mother he has come for a mortgage payment, but then he realizes that Casper is a ghost. Terrified, he tears up the mortgage which he tells Casper to keep (because he doesn't want to have a "haunted" house on the market) and runs off in fright, so fast that he sets a bridge on fire.

Despondent, Casper decides to go back home to his own family, accepting that he will never be anything but "a scary old ghost without any friends". He is about to leave when the mother picks him up with a smile on her face, accepting him for saving her and the children from having their home repossessed. The short concludes with the mother seeing Casper now wearing schoolboy clothes, Bonnie, and Johnny off to school together.

Additional Voice Cast
 Cecil Roy voices Casper, Bonnie
 Mae Questel voices Johnny, Mother
 Jackson Beck voices Landlord
 Jack Mercer voices Ghost, Rooster

See also
List of films in the public domain

References

External links
 
 

1945 animated films
1940s American animated films
American animated short films
1940s English-language films
Films directed by Isadore Sparber
Casper the Friendly Ghost films
1940s animated short films
1945 short films
Paramount Pictures short films
1945 comedy films
American comedy short films
American ghost films
Animated films about trains